The 15125 / 26 Kashi Patna Jan Shatabdi Express is a Superfast express train of the Jan Shatabdi Express series belonging to Indian Railways - North Eastern Railway zone that runs between Banaras and Patna Junction in India.

It operates as train number 15125 from Banaras to Patna Junction and as train number 15126 in the reverse direction serving the states of Uttar Pradesh and Bihar.

It is among the latest trains introduced in the Jan Shatabdi Express series which were originally started by the then railway minister of India Mr. Nitish Kumar during the 2002 – 03 railway budget

Coaches

The 15125 / 26 Banaras Patna Kashi Patna Jan Shatabdi Express has 1 AC Chair Car, 11 2nd Class seating, 2 Unreserved/General and 2 Seating cum Luggage Rake Coaches. It does not carry a Pantry car coach   

As is customary with most train services in India, Coach Composition may be amended at the discretion of Indian Railways depending on demand.

Service

Despite the average speed of the train being below , as per Indian Railways rules, its fare includes a Superfast surcharge.

Routeing

The 15125 / 26 Banaras Patna Kashi Patna Jan Shatabdi Express runs from Banaras via Varanasi Junction, Pandit Deen Dayal Upadhyaya Junction, Buxar, Ara Junction to Patna Junction .

Traction

It is hauled by a Pandit Deen Dayal Upadhyaya (Mughalsarai) based WAP 4.

Operation

The 15125 / 26 Banaras Patna Kashi Patna Jan Shatabdi Express runs on a daily basis in both directions.

References 

 http://pib.nic.in/newsite/erelcontent.aspx?relid=177349
 http://www.uniindia.com/pm-flags-off-manduadih-patna-intercity-express/states/news/1165627.html

External links

http://pib.nic.in/newsite/erelcontent.aspx?relid=177349 
http://www.uniindia.com/piyush-goyal-flags-off-naini-doon-janshatabdi-express/india/news/1330520.html
http://www.uniindia.com/pm-flags-off-manduadih-patna-intercity-express/states/news/1165627.html

https://www.jagran.com/bihar/patna-city-kashi-janshatabdi-express-now-running-to-patna-from-varanasi-know-time-table-17657168.html
https://www.trainman.in/running-status/15125
https://www.trainman.in/running-status/15126
 https://ecr.indianrailways.gov.in/uploads/files/1534401394608-Salient%20feature%20of%20August%202018%20time%20table.pdf
 https://st2.indiarailinfo.com/kjfdsuiemjvcya3/0/1/0/0/3195100/0/dyadgnfx4aapnel1129615.jpg
http://www.indianrailways.gov.in/railwayboard/uploads/directorate/coaching/Coaching_Circulars/CC-33.pdf
http://www.indianrailways.gov.in/railwayboard/uploads/directorate/traffic_comm/downloads/Freight_Rate_2018/CC-36.pdf
https://indiarailinfo.com/train/gallery/78254?

Jan Shatabdi Express trains
Rail transport in Bihar
Passenger trains originating from Varanasi
Railway services introduced in 2018